The 1956–57 NBA season was the Lakers' ninth season in the NBA.

Regular season

Season standings

x – clinched playoff spot

Record vs. opponents

Game log

Playoffs

|- align="center" bgcolor="#ffcccc"
| 1
| March 16
| @ St. Louis
| L 111–114 (OT)
| Clyde Lovellette (30)
| Lovellette, Dukes (12)
| Kiel Auditorium
| 0–1
|-

|- align="center" bgcolor="#ccffcc"
| 1
| March 17
| Fort Wayne
| W 131–127
| Clyde Lovellette (30)
| Minneapolis Auditorium
| 1–0
|- align="center" bgcolor="#ccffcc"
| 2
| March 19
| @ Fort Wayne
| W 110–108
| Slick Leonard (19)
| War Memorial Coliseum
| 2–0
|-

|- align="center" bgcolor="#ffcccc"
| 1
| March 21
| @ St. Louis
| L 109–118
| Vern Mikkelsen (24)
| Clyde Lovellette (11)
| Slick Leonard (9)
| Kiel Auditorium6,028
| 0–1
|- align="center" bgcolor="#ffcccc"
| 2
| March 24
| @ St. Louis
| L 104–106
| Clyde Lovellette (33)
| Walter Dukes (20)
| —
| Kiel Auditorium9,451
| 0–2
|- align="center" bgcolor="#ffcccc"
| 3
| March 26
| St. Louis
| L 135–143 (2OT)
| Slick Leonard (42)
| —
| —
| Minneapolis Auditorium
| 0–3
|-

Awards and records
 Dick Garmaker, All-NBA Second Team
 Dick Garmaker, NBA All-Star Game
 Vern Mikkelsen, NBA All-Star Game
 Slater Martin, NBA All-Star Game

References

Los Angeles Lakers seasons
Minneapolis
Minnesota Lakers
Minnesota Lakers